Sofia Banzhaf is a Canadian actress and filmmaker from Newfoundland and Labrador. Banzhaf was born in Germany and spent part of her early life in the United States. She is most noted for her 2019 short film I Am in the World as Free and Slender as a Deer on a Plain, which premiered at the 2019 Toronto International Film Festival and was named to TIFF's annual year-end Canada's Top Ten list for short films.

As an actress, her roles have included the films Closet Monster (2015), We Forgot to Break Up (2017), Splinters (2018), Black Conflux (2019) and Stage Mother (2020), and the television series Bitten (2014–2016).

Filmography
2013 - Silent Retreat: Alexis
2015 - Closet Monster: Gemma
2016 - Delta Venus: Annabel
2017 - Kingdom City Drowning, Ep1. The Champion (Short): Maika
2017 - We Forgot to Break Up: Allison
2018 - Splinters: Belle
2018 - Honey Bee: Cherry
2019 - Bing! Bang! Bi! (Short): Sofia
2019 - Murdoch Mysteries (TV series): Bella Cooper (episode "The Killing Dose")
2020 - Stage Mother: Young Maybelline
2021 - The Communist's Daughter (web series): Dunyasha
2023 - Wong & Winchester: Sarah Winchester

See also
 List of female film and television directors

References

External links

21st-century Canadian actresses
21st-century Canadian screenwriters
21st-century Canadian women writers
Canadian film actresses
Canadian television actresses
Canadian women film directors
Canadian women screenwriters
Actresses from Newfoundland and Labrador
Film directors from Newfoundland and Labrador
Writers from Newfoundland and Labrador
Living people
Canadian people of German descent
Year of birth missing (living people)